The Lancashire Cup was an English Rugby Football Union competition founded in 1971.  It was organized by the Lancashire Rugby Football Union and was open to all eligible clubs in the Lancashire region including a number of clubs in Cheshire and Merseyside.  The men's competition was discontinued at the end of 2013 as there were not enough teams willing to participate in the cup (partly due to the increased demands of league rugby).

History

Despite the Lancashire RFU being established in 1881 and having the most successful county team in the country, club rugby union took a long time to catch on in Lancashire.  While bitter rivals Yorkshire had an established county club competition (the Yorkshire Cup) which had been running since 1878, Lancashire did not have a similar competition until 1971.  This lack of competitive rugby meant that Lancashire had a smaller membership of clubs when compared to its counterpart.  Some of the current clubs competing seem to be based outside of Lancashire, such as Liverpool St Helens and Waterloo, but when the Lancashire RFU was founded, places like Merseyside and Liverpool were part of the county, and these teams have retained their membership.

Final results

Number of wins

 Orrell (10)
 Waterloo (7)
 Liverpool/Liverpool St Helens (5)
 Fylde (4)
 Sedgley Park (4)
 Manchester (3)
 Preston Grasshoppers (3)
 Vale of Lune (2)
 West Park St Helens (2)
 Widnes (2)

See also
 Lancashire RFU
 English rugby union system
 Rugby union in England

References

Rugby union cup competitions in England
Recurring sporting events established in 1971
Rugby union in Lancashire
History of rugby union in England